Apan is a city and one of the 84 municipalities of Hidalgo, in central-eastern Mexico. The municipality covers an area of 346.9 km².

Overview
As of 2005, the municipality had a total population of 39,247.

It was an important site in the War of Independence (1810-1821). It is a center for the production of pulque and for the sport of charrería, or Mexican rodeo .

Gallery

References

External links

Municipalities of Hidalgo (state)
Populated places in Hidalgo (state)